Klappertaart is a Dutch-influenced Indonesian cake originating from Manado, North Sulawesi.
Klappertaart is Dutch for "coconut cake" or "coconut tart" and it's made from flour, sugar, milk, butter, and the flesh and juice of coconuts.

See also

 Bread pudding
 Coconut cake

References 

Manado cuisine
Indonesian cuisine
Foods containing coconut